was a district located in Ōita Prefecture, Japan.

As of 2003, the district had an estimated population of 33,239 and the density of 47.09 persons per km2. The total area was 705.90 km2.

Towns and villages
 Honjō
 Kamae
 Kamiura
 Naokawa
 Tsurumi
 Ume
 Yayoi
 Yonōzu

Merger
 On March 3, 2005  the towns of Kamae, Kamiura, Tsurumi, Ume and Yayoi, and the villages of Honjō, Naokawa and Yonōzu were merged into the expanded city of Saiki

Former districts of Ōita Prefecture